Estadio Francisco Mendoza Pizarro is a football stadium in Olmos, Lambayeque. It has a natural grass field and three stand that hold 5,000 people. It was opened on July 8, 2012 with a game between Los Caimanes and Atlético Minero which the first won by 1–0. Juan Aurich from Chiclayo and Los Caimanes from Puerto Etén use it as their alternate fields.

References

Francisco Mendoza Pizarro
Buildings and structures in Lambayeque Region